The 2009 Shield featured the same teams as participated in 2008.  In the 2009 fixture, Italy became the first nation to win back-to-back European Shields. As a result they were drafted into the 2009 European Cup, following Russia's withdrawal from that competition. The Czech Republic also reached a milestone, recording their first win in the competition, beating Germany 30 - 4.

Results

Standings

See also

References

External links

European Shield